The Dynamo Kyiv junior squads and Academy includes several junior teams and a football school that develop new talents for FC Dynamo Kyiv. Besides some reserve teams that competed in lower leagues, the club also has junior teams that participate in competitions under-21 and under-19 of the Ukrainian Premier League. In additions to that the club also has its own football academy (school) that exists since 1957. 

The children-youth football school Dynamo Kyiv of Valeriy Lobanovsky is a football school (academy) of Dynamo Kyiv. The club operates the academy for boys from the age of seven upwards. The club's primary base is located in southern outskirts of Kyiv, Koncha-Zaspa, however its school is located in residential area of western parts of Kyiv known as Nyvky.

Unlike the club's older junior squads that competed in parallel competitions of the Ukrainian Premier League, the school fields teams in following age categories in the Ukrainian Youth Football League, U-14, U-15, U-16, and U-17. The earlier age category teams participate in the regional city competitions.

The graduates of senior squad, U-17, get promoted to the youth (U-21 and U-19) squads which play in separate youth competition organized by the Ukrainian Premier League.

Squads

Under-19

Current technical staff

Honors

Domestic
 U-17 championship
 Champions: 1998–99, 2009-10 (group 1), 2013-14
 U-16 championship
Runners-up: 1999-2000

International
 Subroto Cup (India)
Champions: 2017

References

External links
YFS Dynamo Kyiv 

Youth
Football academies in Ukraine
Youth football in Ukraine
Sport schools in Ukraine
UEFA Youth League teams
1957 establishments in Ukraine
Association football clubs established in 1957